Khogyani may refer to:

Khogyani (tribe), a Pashtun tribe in eastern Afghanistan and western Pakistan.
Khogyani District (Nangarhar), a district in Nangarhar Province, Afghanistan, largely populated by the Khogyani tribe.
Khogyani District (Ghazni), a district in Ghazni Province, Afghanistan.
Khogyani, Ghazni, a town and the capital of Khogyani District in Ghazni Province, Afghanistan.